Deglet Nour also spelled Deglet Noor (Modern Arabic: ; from Classical Arabic دقْلَة النُور :daqlatu (a)n-nūr - literally, "date-palm of light"; "heavenly date"; from Classical Arabic  daqal, a kind of date palm) is a cultivar of the date palm which originated in the oasis of Tolga in Algeria. Commonly referred to as the "queen of all dates", the authentic Algerian Deglet Nour date has a soft touch, a translucent light color and a soft honey-like taste, characteristics which distinguish it from other dates.

Deglet Nours are popular in Algeria, Libya and Tunisia, where it is grown in inland oases and is the chief export cultivar. Deglet Nour is one of hundreds of cultivars of date palm but is, according to the Food and Agriculture Organization of the United Nations (FAO), the leading date in terms of export value.

Origins
Several old books provide evidence that the Deglet Nour date was first grown in Algeria. Among them are Le palmier-dattier by Pierre Munier, L'Algérie: un siècle de colonisation française by Félix Falck, Un voyage au pays des dattes by Jean-Henri Fabre as well as le Bulletin de la Société botanique de France. Munier  states that the fruit was introduced at the end of the 13th century and at the beginning of the 14th century from the oasis of Tolga to the neighboring areas of Biskra and Oued Righ in Algeria, before being brought to Tunisia at the end of the 17th century by a grower from Tozeur named Sidi Touati.

The Algerian Ministry of Agriculture has decided to act in order to reserve the Deglet Nour label to Algerian dates.

Production
This cultivar of date is mainly grown in Algeria (Tolga, Oued Righ), in Tunisia (in the areas of Jérid and Nefzaoua), and in the United States (in California, Arizona and Texas) where this cultivar was brought at the beginning of the 20th century.

References

External links
 Comparison chart of dates
African Manager: Tunisie / Deglet Nour : un produit en quête d’un surcroît de lumière

Date cultivars